Kildwick and Crosshills [sic] was a railway station off Station Road in Cross Hills, North Yorkshire (formerly West Riding of Yorkshire), England. It served the villages of Cross Hills, Cowling, Glusburn, Kildwick and Sutton-in-Craven.

History

The station was opened in late 1847 by the Leeds and Bradford Extension Railway, located between Cononley and Steeton and Silsden.  The latter, which is about two miles from both Cross Hills and Kildwick, is now the nearest station to all five villages. The station was originally called Kildwick, then Kildwick and Cross Hills. The original station was located on a level crossing on the modern-day A6068 just south of its junction with the A629 at Kildwick roundabout on the River Aire. In 1889 the station, which by now had been renamed Kildwick and Crosshills and was owned by the Midland Railway, was relocated ¼ mile to the west, by a humpback bridge on the road now known as Station Road.

Some former railway buildings have survived in this area, although they have been sold for other uses, but a signal box which stood beside the level crossing was demolished following the resignalling and electrification of the route in 1993–4.  There is a former railway goods yard on the southern side of the track between the bridge and the level crossing and this is now used as a depot for road repairs by the local council.

The station was closed on 22 March 1965 and its buildings and platforms subsequently removed, but the line remains in use for freight, express passenger and local passenger trains. Proposals have been put forward on several occasions to re-open the station but none of these have been successful. West Yorkshire Metro listed the former site as having a strong business case in 2014 and ordered further study. However in December 2017, North Yorkshire County Council announced the shelving of plans to reopen the station due to a very low Benefit/Cost Ratio and because a reopened station would mean additional traffic on local roads and would cause the barriers at the adjacent Kildwick level crossing to be in the down position for longer.

Accident
Kildwick and Cross Hills station was the site of a serious accident in 1875, killing five and injuring 40. Late at night on 28 August, an excursion returning from Morecambe to Leeds was stopped at the station at the request of the  signalman who had noticed its rear light was not working. Despite his request, the same signalman allowed an Ingleton-to-Leeds mail train to follow just 4½ minutes behind. The signalman claimed the mail train was let through on a "caution" signal; the engine driver claimed the signal was "all clear". Approaching Kildwick station, the driver did not see a stop signal until it was too late, and hit the stationary passenger train at 15 mph. The accident could have been avoided if the "timed interval" signalling system which was in use at the time had been replaced by the "absolute block" system that the Midland Railway was already phasing in. Under the old system, trains were allowed to follow within five minutes of each other while under the new system, a section of track had to be completely clear before a train could enter it.

Notes

References
(1948, reprinted 1999), British Railways Atlas 1947, Ian Allan Publishing, Shepperton, 
Bairstow, M. (1994), The Leeds, Settle & Carlisle Railway, Martin Bairstow, Halifax, 
Binns, D. (1984), Steam in Airedale, Wyvern Publications, Skipton, 

Dewick, T. (2002), Complete Atlas of Railway Station Names, Ian Allan Publishing, Hersham, 
Wignall, C.J. (1983), Complete British Railways Maps and Gazetteer from 1830–1981, Oxford Railway Publishing Co., Poole, 

Craven District
Disused railway stations in North Yorkshire
Former Midland Railway stations
Railway stations in Great Britain closed in 1965
Railway stations in Great Britain opened in 1847
Beeching closures in England
1847 establishments in England
1875 in England
1875 disasters in the United Kingdom